FC Nig Aparan ), is a defunct Armenian football club from Aparan, Aragatsotn Province. The club was dissolved in 1999 and is inactive from professional football.

References

Nig Aparan
1999 disestablishments in Armenia